Several significant tornadoes have affected the town of Murfreesboro, Tennessee:

The April 1974 tornado during the 1974 Super Outbreak
The January 1997 tornado which injured 18 people and caused almost $5 million in damage
The April 2002 tornado which injured 31 people
The Murfreesboro 2009 tornado which killed 2 and injured 41